The 2023 Senior Bowl was a college football all-star game played on February 4, 2023, at Hancock Whitney Stadium in Mobile, Alabama. The game featured prospects for the 2023 draft of the professional National Football League (NFL), predominantly from the NCAA Division I Football Bowl Subdivision (FBS). It was one of the final 2022–23 bowl games concluding the 2022 FBS football season. Sponsored by Reese's Peanut Butter Cups, the game was officially known as the Reese's Senior Bowl, with television coverage provided by NFL Network.

Coaches

Bowl organizers, in cooperation with the National Football League (NFL), named staff members from the Chicago Bears and Las Vegas Raiders to coach the teams. Luke Getsy of the Bears was named head coach of the American team and Patrick Graham of the Raiders was named head coach of the National team.

Players

National team
Full roster online .

American team
Full roster online .

Game summary
Note: the game was played with a two-minute warning at the end of each quarter, followed by a change in possession.

References

Senior Bowl
Senior Bowl
Senior Bowl
Senior Bowl